Grzegorz Krejner (born 25 February 1969) is a Polish former cyclist. He competed at four Olympic Games, including Barcelona 1992, Atlanta 1996, Sydney 2000, and Athens 2004.

References

1969 births
Living people
Polish male cyclists
Olympic cyclists of Poland
Cyclists at the 1992 Summer Olympics
Cyclists at the 1996 Summer Olympics
Cyclists at the 2000 Summer Olympics
Cyclists at the 2004 Summer Olympics
People from Żyrardów
Sportspeople from Masovian Voivodeship